Longing in Their Hearts is the twelfth album by Bonnie Raitt, released in 1994. The album contained the mainstream pop hit, "Love Sneakin' Up On You," which reached #19 on the Billboard singles chart, and "You", which remains to date her only UK Top 40 hit, peaking at No. 31.

Track listing
"Love Sneakin' Up On You" (Tom Snow, Jimmy Scott) – 3:41
"Longing in Their Hearts" (Bonnie Raitt, Michael O'Keefe) – 4:48
"You" (John Shanks, Bob Thiele Jr., Tonio K.) – 4:27
"Cool, Clear Water" (Raitt) – 5:27
"Circle Dance" (Raitt) – 4:11
"I Sho Do" (Teenie Hodges, Billy Always) – 3:38
"Dimming of the Day" (Richard Thompson) – 3:39
"Feeling of Falling" (Raitt) – 6:17
"Steal Your Heart Away" (Paul Brady) – 5:44
"Storm Warning" (Terry Britten, Lea Maalfrid) – 4:31
"Hell to Pay" (Raitt) – 4:03
"Shadow of Doubt" (Gary Nicholson) – 4:26

Personnel 
 Bonnie Raitt – lead vocals, backing vocals (1, 3, 6), slide guitar (1, 6, 10, 11), acoustic guitar (2, 3), keyboards (4), electric piano (5), string and woodwind arrangements (5), horn arrangements (6), organ (8), slide acoustic guitar (12), foot sounds (12), arrangements (12)
 Scott Thurston – keyboards (1, 6, 11), keyboard programming (5)
 Bob Thiele, Jr. – synth accordion (3), synth pad (3), arrangements (3)
 Benmont Tench – Hammond C3 organ (5, 7, 9), keyboards (9, 10)
 Mitchell Froom – harmonium (7)
 George Marinelli – electric guitar (1, 2, 3), mandolin (2, 4), guitars (4), lead guitar (9)
 Mark Goldenberg – electric guitar (3), oud (3), "first" acoustic guitar (7)
 Randy Jacobs – lead guitar (6), rhythm guitar (6, 9), electric guitar (11)
 Richard Thompson – "second" acoustic guitar (7)
 Stephen Bruton – electric guitar (8)
 James "Hutch" Hutchinson – bass guitar (1-4, 6, 8-11)
 Don Was – acoustic bass (5)
 Buell Neidlinger – acoustic bass (7)
 Ricky Fataar – drums (1, 2, 4, 6, 8-11)
 Paulinho da Costa – percussion (1-6, 8-11)
 Debra Dobkin – Celtic bass drum (4)
 Jon Clarke – alto flute (5), bass flute (5), English horn (5)
 David Campbell – string and woodwind arrangements (5)
 Larry Corbett – cello (5) 
 Suzie Katayama – cello (5)
 Daniel Smith – cello (5)
 Scott Haupert – viola (5)
 Cynthia Morrow – viola (5)
 Marty Grebb – baritone saxophone (6), horn arrangements (6)
 The Memphis Horns 
 Andrew Love – tenor saxophone (6), horn arrangements (6)
 Wayne Jackson – trombone (6), trumpet (6), horn arrangements (6)
 Charlie Musselwhite – harmonica (12)
 Sweet Pea Atkinson – backing vocals (1, 4, 6, 9, 10)
 Sir Harry Bowens – backing vocals (1, 3, 4, 6, 9, 10)
 David Lasley – backing vocals (1, 3, 4, 9, 10)
 Arnold McCuller – backing vocals (1, 3, 4, 6, 9, 10)
 Levon Helm – harmony vocals (2)
 Paul Brady – harmony vocals (4, 7), penny whistle (4), acoustic guitar (9)
 David Crosby – harmony vocals (5)

Production
 Producers – Bonnie Raitt and Don Was
 Production Coordination – Marsha Burns, assisted by Carrie McConkey.
 Engineer and Mixing – Ed Cherney
 Assistant Engineer – Dan Bosworth
 Additional Engineers – Chris Albert, Dan Bosworth, Brad Cook and James Saez.
 Recorded at Ocean Way Recording, Chomsky Ranch, The Convent and Record Plant (Los Angeles, CA); The Power Station (New York, NY)
 Mix Assistant – Michael Reiter
 Mixed at Record Plant
 Mastered by Doug Sax at The Mastering Lab (Hollywood, CA). 
 Art Direction – Jeffrey Fey and Tommy Steele
 Design – Jeffrey Fey 
 Photography – John Casado
 Centerspread Painting – Clayton Campbell
 Lettering Design and Logo – Tim Girvin Design, Inc.
 Management – Jeffrey Hersh, Ron Stone and Jane Oppenheimer.

Other information
Stevie Nicks covered "Circle Dance" on her first live album, The Soundstage Sessions, which was released on March 31, 2009.

Charts

Weekly charts

Year-end charts

Awards
Grammy Awards

Notes 

Bonnie Raitt albums
1994 albums
Albums produced by Don Was
Capitol Records albums
Grammy Award for Best Pop Vocal Album
Grammy Award for Best Engineered Album, Non-Classical